Movement is the debut studio album by English rock band New Order, released on 13 November 1981 by Factory Records. Recorded in the wake of Joy Division frontman Ian Curtis' suicide the previous year, the album is a continuation of the dark post-punk sound of Joy Division's material, increasing the use of synthesizers while still being predominantly rooted in rock. At the time of its release, the album was not particularly well received by critics or audiences, only peaking at number thirty on the UK Albums Chart; the band would gradually shift to a more electronic sound over the course of the next year.

In the decades since its release, retrospective critical reception has been very positive, with reviewers praising the album as a middle ground between the band's work as Joy Division and their subsequent alternative dance material. Slant Magazine placed the album at number 42 on its list of the "Best Albums of the 1980s", saying it "exists almost exactly in between Joy Division's post-punk sound and the synth-pop style that would come to define New Order and influence pop music for decades".

Recording
After the suicide of Joy Division's singer Ian Curtis in May 1980, and the subsequent shock for those surrounding him, remaining members Bernard Sumner, Peter Hook, and Stephen Morris elected to carry on, albeit under a new name – New Order. With the exception of two songs, "Ceremony" (first played live at Joy Division's last gig, a little over two weeks before Curtis's death) and "In a Lonely Place" (unreleased, but demoed in the studio), all the material played would be new.

A couple of songs on Movement stem from the initial songwriting session the band undertook in the summer of 1980. "Dreams Never End" and "Truth" were both played at the initial New Order concerts (still played as a trio) in the US that September. At this point it was still undecided as to who should be vocalist. The interim solution was that all three members took turns at singing before finally deciding that Bernard Sumner should take the main vocalist's role with Peter Hook as back-up (though he sang lead on "Dreams Never End" and "Doubts Even Here"). The introduction in October 1980 of Gillian Gilbert, Stephen Morris's girlfriend, lightened the burden on Sumner who had to play guitar and keyboards and sing (something he found impossible to do simultaneously) and enabled the band to pursue a more electronic approach. Subsequently, the remainder of the songs that appeared on Movement were written and then recorded over a seven-month period "in two big bits, and a whole lot of little bits", according to Sumner, as well as "Mesh", "Cries and Whispers" (both early live staples and used as B-sides), "Procession" and "Everything's Gone Green", the latter forming a non-album single released as FAC53 in September 1981.

The producer of the album was once again Martin Hannett, who had worked with them as Joy Division; however, the rapport between producer and band had in the ensuing time eroded. Hannett was in a legal dispute with Factory Records and suffering from substance and alcohol abuse, and the band members—themselves still coming to terms with having to write and arrange songs without Curtis's ear and lyric-writing ability—found him uncooperative. It would be the last album that they worked on together, with Hannett walking out on the band during the production of "Everything's Gone Green".

Sound

Musically, Movement is a transitional album. References to Ian Curtis appear on the songs "ICB" (rumoured to be an acronym for 'Ian Curtis Buried', confirmed by Peter Hook in a 2013 interview) and "The Him". The expansion of the sonic palette heard on Closer is also present on this album with synths on all but the opening track and electronic percussion (especially on "Truth"). Hook's bass takes on a melodic role while Gilbert provides the low end on the songs "Chosen Time" and "Denial". However, despite this continuity, Movement also hints at New Order's distinct sound on its later albums. Tracks such as "Senses" flirt with funkier guitar motifs than Joy Division, and "Dreams Never End" is the only song on this album with the classic guitar-bass-drums line-up.

In a questionnaire interview with the fanzine Artificial Life (No. 2, Nov. 1982), the band were asked if they were happy with the album to which they replied, "We were happy with the songs, not all happy with the production." Peter Hook later revealed, "We were confused musically ... Our songwriting wasn't coming together. I don't know how we pulled out of that one. I actually liked Movement, but I know why nobody else likes it. It was good for the first two-and-a-half minutes, then it dipped."

Artwork
The album's cover was designed by Peter Saville and is based on a poster by the Italian Futurist Fortunato Depero.

The shape created by the top three lines is an 'F' (lying on its back), which refers to Factory Records/Factory Communications Limited and the bottom two lines create an 'L' (lying on its front), the Roman numeral 50, the original catalogue was FACT 50. The blue colour of the lines was chosen by the band; the first copies in the US had the same design in brown on an ivory background.

Reception

Released in November 1981—just weeks after the Joy Division retrospective/live double album Still—Movement was met with a tepid reception, with critics disappointed by what was perceived to be a lack of forward momentum after the "Ceremony" single. It is rumoured that the band considered either re-mixing or even entirely re-recording the album, but time and financial constraints prevented this. A new song called "Temptation" would provide the band with the necessary impetus and a new direction.

Track listing

Personnel
New Order
 Bernard Sumner – vocals, guitars, melodica, synthesizers and programming
 Peter Hook – 4- and 6-stringed bass, vocals ("Dreams Never End" and "Doubts Even Here")
 Gillian Gilbert – synthesizers and programming, guitars, spoken words ("Doubts Even Here")
 Stephen Morris – drums, synthesizers and programming

Technical
 Martin Hannett – production
 Chris Nagle – engineering
 John and Flood – assistants

Release details
 UK 12" – Factory Records (FACT 50)
 UK cassette – Factory Records (FACT 50C)
 UK CD (1986 release) – Factory Records (FACD 50)
 US CD (1988 release) – Factory Records (FACTUS 50 CD)
 UK CD (1993 re-release) – London Records (520,018-2)

Charts

See also
 New Order discography

Notes

External links

 Movement on New Order Online
 Movement on World in Motion

New Order (band) albums
1981 debut albums
Factory Records albums
Albums produced by Martin Hannett